Acrolophia is a genus of flowering plants from the orchid family, Orchidaceae. The genus contains 7 known species, all endemic to South Africa.
 Acrolophia bolusii
 Acrolophia capensis
 Acrolophia cochlearis
 Acrolophia lamellata
 Acrolophia lunata
 Acrolophia micrantha
 Acrolophia ustulata

References

External links 

Eulophiinae genera
Flora of South Africa
Eulophiinae